Inmarsat-4 F1 is a communications I-4 satellite operated by the British satellite operator Inmarsat. It was launched into a geosynchronous orbit at 21:42 GMT on 11 March 2005 from Space Launch Complex 41 at Cape Canaveral, Florida. By an Atlas V in the 431 configuration. It is currently located at 143.5 degrees East.

Inmarsat-4 F1 was constructed by EADS Astrium, using a Eurostar E3000 bus. It has a mass of 5959 kg and is expected to operate for 13 years

On 17 February 2018 Inmarsat-4 F1 experienced outage due to loss of attitude control.

References

External links 
 http://space.skyrocket.de/doc_sdat/inmarsat-4.htm
 http://www.inmarsat.com/about-us/our-satellites/our-coverage/
 http://www.as.northropgrumman.com/products/aa_inmarsat/index.html

Communications satellites in geostationary orbit
Satellites using the Eurostar bus
Spacecraft launched in 2005
Inmarsat satellites